This page includes a list of festivals that occur (or have occurred) regularly in Wales.

List of festivals 
List of festivals in Wales, organised by month, including location.

February 

 Dydd Miwsig Cymru

March 
 Laugharne Weekend (Laugharne)

April 

 Machynlleth Comedy festival (Machynlleth)
 Wales International Harp Festival
 Lost Cove Surf Festival (St Davids)

May 
 Hay festival (Hay-on-Wye)
 Urdd National Eisteddfod (location changes)
 Inside Out festival (Bute Park, Cardiff)
 FOCUS Wales (Wrexham)
 Gwyl Fach y Fro (Barry Island)
 Balter Festival (Chepstow)

June 
 Gwyl Gregynog Festival (Gregynog Hall)
 Fire in the Mountain (near Abermagwr)
 Gottwood festival (Llanfaethlu)
 The Big Retreat Festival (Lawrenny)
 Unearthed Festival (Solva)

July 
 Tafwyl (Cardiff Castle)
 Llangollen International Musical Eisteddfod (Llangollen)
 Sesiwn Fawr Dolgellau (Dolgellau)
 Royal Welsh Show (Llanelwedd)
 Steelhouse Festival (Aberbeeg)
 Parti Ponty (Ynysangharad War Memorial Park, Pontypridd)
 The Good Life Experience festival, Summer Camp (Hawarden)
 The Gower festival (Gower Peninsula)
 Big Love festival (Trostrey)
 Westival (Manorbier)
 Landed Festival (Llanwrthwl)

August 

 National Eisteddfod of Wales (location changes)
 Green Man Festival (Brecon Beacons)
 Pride Cymru (Cardiff)
 Brecon Jazz Festival (Brecon)
 The Green Gathering (Chepstow)
 Truefest (Hay-on-Wye)
 Hub Festival (Cardiff)
 Between the Trees (Merthyr Mawr)

September 

 Festival N°6 (Portmeirion)
 Abergavenny Food Festival (Abergavenny)
 HowTheLightGetsIn Hay (Hay-on-Wye)
 The Good Life Experience festival, Camp Good Life, Autumn (Hawarden)
 Aberystwyth Comedy festival (Aberystwyth)
 Cowbridge Music Festival (Cowbridge)
 Gladfest (Gladstone's Library, Hawarden)
 The Big Cwtch (Crugybar)

October 

 Cardiff International Film Festival (Cardiff)
 Cwlwm Celtaidd (Porthcawl)
 Swn festival (Cardiff)
 Iris Prize Festival (Cardiff)

November 

 Gwyl Cerdd Dant

See also

 Culture of Wales
 Music of Wales

References 

Festivals in Wales